Rheinhausen is a district of the city of Duisburg in Germany, with a population of 78,203 (December 31, 2020) and an area of 38.68 km². It lies on the left bank of the river Rhine.

Rheinhausen consists of the neighbourhoods: Rumeln-Kaldenhausen, Hochemmerich (including Asterlagen), Bergheim (including Trompet-Oestrum), Friemersheim, and the central part: Rheinhausen-Mitte, which has a population of 10,666. It has railway stations, Rheinhausen station and Rheinhausen Ost station on the Osterath–Dortmund Süd railway.

History
In the surroundings of Rheinhausen, there are traces of settlements dating back to the Roman period. Remains of a guardhouse on the Roman boundary, the limes, have been found during sewerage works. Later, the Irish bishop Ludger is said to have done missionary work in this region.

Until administrative reorganisation in 1975 Rheinhausen had been an independent city. It had received city rights in 1934, but the original city charter has been lost because of fire during World War II.

On May 8, 1945 the ADSEC Engineer Group A, led by Col. Swenholt commanding officer of the 332nd Engineer General Service Regiment, constructed the Duisburg-Hochfeld rail bridge on the Duisburg-Ruhrort–Mönchengladbach line across the River Rhine between Duisburg and Rheinhausen.  The bridge was 2,815 feet (0.86 kM) in length, and took six days, fifteen hours and twenty minutes to construct, a record time. The Bridge was named "Victory Bridge".

Rheinhausen had long been an industrial city, with coal mines and steelworks. The large steel company Krupp owned a plant in the city. It was closed in 1986.

Near the Rheinhausen central is the City-Hall-Rheinhausen, The Alpha-Haus and a school, which is called Realschule Rheinhausen I (Körnerplatz).

See also
Pylons of Duisburg-Rheinhausen

References

Duisburg